Melvyn David Capleton (born 24 October 1973 in Hackney) is an English professional football goalkeeper.

Career
Capleton began his career with Southend United in 1990.  Three years later, he joined Billy Ayre's Blackpool on a free transfer. Due to his role as back-up to the Seasiders first-choice goalkeeper Lee Martin, Capleton only made eleven league appearances in his three years at Bloomfield Road. He was released in May 1996.

After two years with Billericay Town, Leyton Orient offered Capleton a return to the professional game. After only a month with the Londoners, his first club, Southend, signed him for just one game in October 1998. He returned to the club on a permanent basis, however, in March the following year.

Capleton went on to make 56 appearances for Southend in two years. His third season at Roots Hall was spent on loan to Grays Athletic. He made the move permanent in 2002.

He signed for St Albans City in the summer of 2004 but was released at the end of the season. He then joined his former club Billericay Town for a season.

In 2007, he joined Canvey Island as goalkeeping coach.

He currently works as a personal fitness trainer and coaches young children in the South West London area.

References
Capleton's stats at Soccerbase
Profile at St Albans' official site
"Where are they now?" - My Eyes Have Seen The Glory

External links
"Glory after hell for Mel" - Sunday Mirror
"Former Pro Footballer Mel Capleton" - The London Word

1973 births
Footballers from the London Borough of Hackney
Living people
English footballers
Association football goalkeepers
Southend United F.C. players
Blackpool F.C. players
Billericay Town F.C. players
Leyton Orient F.C. players
Grays Athletic F.C. players
St Albans City F.C. players
English Football League players
Isthmian League players